The Pamba River (also called Pampa River) is the longest river in the Indian state of Kerala after Periyar and Bharathappuzha, and the longest river in the erstwhile former princely state of Travancore. Sabarimala temple dedicated to Lord Ayyappa is located on the banks of the river Pamba.

The river is also known as 'Dakshina Bhageerathi'. During ancient times it was called 'River Baris' and jordan of malankara 

The River Pamba enriches the lands of Pathanamthitta District and the Kuttanad area of Alappuzha District and few areas of Kottayam

Course
Starting from the Idukki district and traversing a distance of  through Pathanamthitta and Alappuzha districts, the river joins the Arabian Sea through a number of channels. The basin is bounded on the east by Western Ghats and on the west by Arabian Sea. The river shares its northern boundary with the Manimala River basin, and the southern boundary with the Achankovil River basin.

The river flows through Chittar, Vadasserikkara, Ranni, Ayroor, Cherukole, Keezhukara, Kozhencherry, Maramon, Aranmula, Arattupuzha, Edanad, Puthencavu, Chengannur, Kallissery, Pandanad, Parumala, Mannar, Kadapra, Melpadom, Thevery, Veeyapuram, Thakazhy, Pullangady, Pallathuruthy before emptying into the Vembanad Lake, while another branch flows directly via Karuvatta into Thottappally Spillway. One branch of Pamba called Varattar flows from Arattupuzha/Puthenkavu and along Edanad, Othera, Thiruvanvandoor, Eramallikkara and flows into Manimala River at Kallumkal East side. Another branch of Pamba flows from Kuthiathode and joins with Manimala River at Kallumkal West side, and branches out again at Nedumpuram from Manimala River and flows along Thalavady, Edathua, Champakulam, Pullangady, Nedumudy and empties into Vembanad Lake at Kainakary. This branch links with Mainstream Pamba River at Pullangady while continuing to flow to Vembanad lake. One branch of Achankovil River joins with Pamba at Paippad/Veeyapuram, while another branch flows into Pamba again via Karichal, Cheruthana. Perunthenaruvi is the major waterfall in Pamba river between vechoochira and Athikkayam

Tributaries
Azhuthayar
Kakkiyar
Kakkattar
Kallar
Aadhi Pamba
Varattar
Kuttemperoor
Utharappalliyar
Kolarayar
Njunungar
Madatharuvi
Kozhithodu
Thanungattilthodu

Topography of the basin, reservoirs and command area
Like all the river basins in Kerala, the Pamba basin also can be divided into three natural zones based on elevation, consisting of low land or seaboard, midland and high land. The coast for a short distance along the borders of lakes is flat, retreating from it the surface roughens up into slopes which gradually combine and swell into mountains on the east. The low land area along sea coast is generally swampy and liable to be flooded during monsoon inundation. The plains/midlands succeed low land in gentle ascents and valleys interspersed with isolated low hills. The high land on the eastern portion is broken by long spurs, dense forests, extensive ravines and tangled jungles. Towering above all their slopes are Western Ghats that form eastern boundary of the basins.

Endangered state

Due to drought and a lack of conservation and protection by the government, the Pampa River has shrunk to a stream and is totally dry in many places. Nearby wells have also dried up. Water for farming, such as paddy fields, is scarce. Experts are calling for governmental awareness of the dire situation and the need to rein in development that is destroying the environment.

The Kerala High Court has initiated steps to control the pollution of the river from the practice of some visitors to Sabarimala who throw their clothes into it. As part of the Punyam Poonkavanam project, pilgrims have been exhorted to avoid the usage of soap and oil while bathing in River Pamba. They are also requested not to throw any material, including clothes, to this holy river. At a broader level, this project aims to spread the message of cleanliness and greenness beyond Pamba and Sabarimala.

Significance in Hinduism

Lord Ayyappan (Sri Dharmasastha) appeared to the Pandalam Raja as a child on the banks of the Pamba River. The Pamba River has been venerated as Ganga of kerala, and devotees of Lord Ayyappan believe that immersing oneself in the Pamba is equivalent to bathing in the Holy Ganges River. Bathing in the river, believed to absolve one's sins, is a requirement before commencing the trek through the forest to the Ayyappan Temple atop Sabarimala. The river pamba flowing in kerala state has many famous temple in its banks other than the Sabarimala.Tiruvalla Sreevallabhapuram temple, Adoor Mannar Temple, Aranmula temple, Chenganoor Mahadeva temple, Thakazhy Sree Dharma Sastha Temple are most famous few among them. The lake or Saras mentioned in Ramayana is Pamba saras and that is the basin of Present Tungabhadra river and the sabariyasram also situated very near. Then the old Kishkindha(Monkey city) or present day Hampi( UNESCO heritage site) also situated near that pamba saras near Hampi.

See also

Melukara
Ayroor
Pathanamthitta District
Sabarimala
Ayyappa
List of rivers in Kerala
Aranmula Kottaram
Ganges River

References

Sources

 nwda.gov.in/writereaddata/linkimages/0413760650.pdf

Rivers of Kerala

External links

Report made by National Water Development Agency on Interlinking of Pamba with Vaippar - PDF

 
Rivers of Pathanamthitta district
Rivers of Idukki district
Rivers of Alappuzha district